"Llorar" is a song recorded by bachata group Aventura. It served as the group's second single from their third studio album Love & Hate. It peaked at number 8 on the Billboard Tropical Airplay chart.

Charts

References

2003 songs
2004 singles
Aventura (band) songs
Songs written by Romeo Santos